Medabots Infinity is a role-playing video game developed and published in 2003 by Natsume. The game is based on the Medabots series. It is the sequel to Medabots.

Hooking up to the Metabee and Rokusho Game Boy Advance games allows for secret unlockable medabots: Arcbeetle (Metabee) and Mega-Emperor (Rokusho). While the GBA link option is inaccessible in the EU version, there's a screenshot of it in the game's EU instruction manual.

Several characters from the anime make appearances in this game.

Plot
Some of Riverview City's kids have apparently gone missing. The Rubberobo Gang may be responsible, so it's up to Ikki to stop them again.

Gameplay
The game is divided into an overworld and stages, in which there are arenas, viewed from a 3D perspective. There are two types of missions in arenas the player must do to complete a stage: Robattling all the enemies or a Robattle one on one.

Reception

Bethany Massimilla of GameSpot gave the game a negative review, remarking “Medabots fans wanting a fix are far better off watching the cartoon instead.”

Game review aggregation website GameRankings gave it a rating of 37.67% based on 6 reviews.

References

External links
 Medabots Infinity at GameFAQs

2003 video games
GameCube games
GameCube-only games
Games with GameCube-GBA connectivity
Multiplayer and single-player video games
Natsume (company) games
Role-playing video games
Video games based on anime and manga
Video games developed in Japan
Video games scored by Iku Mizutani
Video games scored by Kinuyo Yamashita